William Munro (1836–1900) was a state senator in South Carolina. He represented Union County, South Carolina in 1887. His father, Robert Munro, was born in Scotland August 19, 1796.

References

1836 births
1900 deaths
South Carolina state senators
People from Union County, South Carolina